is a city in northwestern Osaka Prefecture, Japan. Its name is commonly romanized as "Minō" or "Minoo"; however, the city government officially uses the spelling Minoh in English. As of October 2016, the city has an estimated population of 134,435 and a population density of 2,800 persons per km².

History
The city was incorporated on 1 December 1956.

Mister Donut opened its first Japanese shop in Minoh in 1971.

Geography

It is accessed by the Hankyu Railway in about 30 minutes from Umeda Station.

Minoh is best known for Meiji no Mori Minō Quasi-National Park, one of Japan's oldest national parks, which is home to a large population of wild monkeys and has a picturesque waterfall.

The 1200-year-old Buddhist temple Katsuō-ji, famous for its huge collection of Daruma dolls is located in Minoh.

Neighboring municipalities
Osaka Prefecture
 Ibaraki
 Ikeda
 Suita
 Toyonaka
 Toyono
Hyōgo Prefecture
Kawanishi

Notable people
 Shōta Chida, Japanese professional shogi player, ranked 7-dan
 Dream Ami, Japanese singer, dancer, model, television personality and J-pop idol (Dream and E-girls; Real Name: Ami Nakashima, Nihongo: 中島 麻未, Nakashima Ami)
 Don Fujii, Japanese professional wrestler (Real Name: Tatsuki Fuji, Nihongo: 藤井 達樹, Fujii Tatsuki)
 Haruka Hirota, Japanese Olympic trampoline gymnast
 Sakiho Juri, Japanese performing artist and former member of the Takarazuka Revue
 Jyongri, Zainichi Korean pop singer (Real Name: Cho Jyong-ri, Hangul: 조종리)
 Masashi Kamekawa, Japanese football player (V-Varen Nagasaki, J2 League)
 Kenji Kasahara, Japanese entrepreneur and the founder of mixi
 Takuya Kimura, Japanese actor, singer, and radio personality (SMAP; Born in Tokyo, Japan, but raised in Minoh)
 Yūki Mizuhara, Japanese actress
 Ryoichi Sasakawa, Japanese businessman, politician, and philanthropist
 Takumi Shimohira, Japanese football player (JEF United Chiba, J2 League)
 Masaki Suda, Japanese actor and singer (Kamen Rider W; Real Name: Taishō Sugō, Nihongo: 菅生 大将, Sugō Taishō)
 Anju Suzuki, Japanese actress, television presenter, and former singer (Real Name: Kakuko Yamagata, Nihongo: 山形 香公子, Yamagata Kakuko)
 Ken Tajiri, Japanese football player (Gainare Tottori, J3 League)
 Teruzakura Hiroyuki, former sumo wrestler (Real Name: Hiroyuki Ozaki, Nihongo: 尾崎弘之, Ozaki Hiroyuki)
 Yuka Uda, Japanese road cyclist
 Yui Watanabe, Japanese voice actress and singer
 Yutaka Yamamoto, Japanese anime director and co-founder of Ordet

Transportation

Railways
Hankyu Railway
Minoh Line: Sakurai Station – Makiochi Station – Minoh Station
Kita-Osaka Kyuko Railway (opening in 2023)
Minō-Kayano Station – Minō-Semba-Handaimae Station

Highway
National highways

Expressways
 Mino-Todoromi Interchange
 Minō Toll Road

Twin towns – sister cities

Minoh is twinned with:
 Cuernavaca, Mexico
 Lower Hutt, New Zealand

See also
Osaka Aoyama College

References

External links
 Minoh City official website 
 Minoh City official website 

Cities in Osaka Prefecture